Tarma may refer to:

Places 
 Tarma, a city in Junín Region, Peru
 Tarma District, Peru
 Tarma Province, Peru
 Tarma, Kentucky, United States
 Roman Catholic Diocese of Tarma, in the Ecclesiastical province of Huancayo in Peru
 Tarma (crater)

Other uses
 Tarma (moth), a genus of moth in the family Geometridae